Samuel James Lyngdoh Kynshi (born 11 March 2000) is an Indian professional footballer who plays as a midfielder for Real Kashmir in the I-League.

Career
Kynshi was promoted to Shillong Lajong senior team from their junior team after his good show in 2017 Under–18 Shillong Premier League and 2017 Shillong Premier League. He made his I-League debut against Gokulam Kerala FC, coming in as substitute for Kynsailang Khongsit. He scored his first goal in second game of the season against Churchill Brothers coming as substitute in second half of the match.

Career statistics

Club

Honours
Real Kashmir
IFA Shield: 2020

References

External links

2000 births
Living people
Footballers from Meghalaya
Indian footballers
Association football midfielders
Shillong Lajong FC players
I-League players
Real Kashmir FC players